LUNA Bars is a brand of nutrition bars created by Clif Bar & Company in 1999. The original product was the first energy bar aimed at women. The brand has expanded to cover nutritional drinks, protein bars, and LUNAFEST, a women's film festival.

History
LUNA claims to be created in 1999 by Clif Bar & Company’s female employees. The bars were formulated to be under 200 calories, to be more appealing to a potential female target audience.

Community outreach
LUNA claims to donate 1% of all product sales to charities that support environmental, social, and cultural needs, mainly to their primary charity, The Breast Cancer Fund.

LUNAFEST
In 2000, LUNA established LUNAFEST, a philanthropic traveling film festival with films written and directed by women. Individuals and organizations can register to host a LUNAFEST in their city, with LUNA providing the films and the materials. Through this fundraising model, the hosting organization can raise funds for The Breast Cancer Fund and the cause or organization of their choice (with 15% of LUNAFEST proceeds supporting the Breast Cancer Fund and the remaining 85% of funds supporting the nonprofit organization chosen by the host). Since 2000, LUNAFEST has raised over $456,000 for the Breast Cancer Fund and $785,000 for other women’s organizations.

Team LUNA Chix
In 2001, Clif Bar co-owners and co-CEOs Gary Erickson and Kit Crawford launched the LUNA Pro Team, a women’s professional mountain biking team. In 2002, they expanded the program to include Team LUNA Chix, a network of women's teams across the country that focus on learning new sports, staying active, and raising money for the Breast Cancer Fund. Although initially focused on mountain biking, the LUNA Pro Team and Team LUNA Chix now also include running, triathlon, and cycling teams. There are over 26 LUNA Chix teams in over 21 cities, with a total 260 members. They were featured in Fitness Magazine as one of fifteen organizations promoting the fight against Breast Cancer.

Reception
Various LUNA products has been profiled in Self, The New York Times, Glamour, Fitness, Us Weekly, and received endorsements from Carrie Underwood and Cameron Diaz. It was voted the favorite energy bar by FitSugar readers.

Bar varieties

Incomplete list of Luna Bar types:
 Blueberry Bliss
 Caramel Nut Brownie
 Carrot Cake
 Chocolate Chunk
 Chocolate Cupcake 
 Chocolate Dipped Coconut
 Chocolate Peppermint Stick
 Chocolate Raspberry
 Cookie Dough
 Cookies ‘n Cream Delight
 Honey Salted Peanut
 Iced Oatmeal Raisin
 Lemon Zest
 Luna Fiber Chocolate Raspberry
 Luna Fiber Peanut Butter Strawberry
 Luna Fiber Vanilla Blueberry
 Luna Protein Chocolate
 Luna Protein Chocolate Cherry Almond
 Luna Protein Chocolate Chip Cookie Dough
 Luna Protein Chocolate Coconut Almond
 Luna Protein Chocolate Peanut Butter
 Luna Protein Cookie Dough
 Luna Protein Lemon Vanilla
 Luna Protein Mint Chocolate Chip
 Mint Chocolate Chip
 Nutz Over Chocolate
 Peanut Butter Cookie
 Peanut Honey Pretzel
 Salted Caramel Nut (Gluten Free)
 S’mores
 Toasted Nuts 'n Cranberry
 Vanilla Almond
 White Chocolate Macadamia

See also 
 List of food companies

References

External links
 Official website
 LUNAFEST film festival website

Energy food products
Products introduced in 1999
Companies based in California
Companies based in Emeryville, California